The Reliquary of St. Eustace is a medieval silver and wooden holy container in the shape of Saint Eustace's head that once formed part of Basel Minster's treasury. The treasury was acquired by the Canton of Basel in 1836 and shortly afterwards sold at auction to collectors and museums across Europe. The reliquary was later bought by the British Museum.

History
For centuries the reliquary belonged to the cathedral treasury of Basel in Switzerland, where it was first recorded in 1477.  It was sold, along with the rest of the treasury, in 1836, shortly after their acquisition by the canton of Basel. After passing through several owners, it was purchased by the British Museum in 1850.

Description
The main image shows the repoussé silver-gilt cover of the reliquary modelled in the shape of the saint's head, which was made between 1180 and 1200 AD.  It is adorned with a headband composed of glass and various precious stones. Around the base, twelve gold figures of the Apostles stand within arcading.  Inside was a contemporary sycamore wooden case with a hollow compartment that held the relics of various saints and fragments of a skull that may have been from the head of Saint Eustace. The wooden head and relics were only discovered when the outer silver case was being cleaned in 1956.

Relic Deposit
From the ninth century, enshrining items which had once belonged to saints or church leaders, such as their bones or parts of their clothing,  was an important feature of religious life in early medieval Europe. The reliquary could often be in the shape of a foot, arm, bell or even a domed building. In this case, the medieval silversmith had designed the relic deposit container in the shape of St. Eustace's head, who was an important Roman military saint. The image was designed to convey the sacredness and majesty of the saint to the pious faithful. Many of these luxury items were later melted down and destroyed during the reformation.

Gallery

References

Further reading
J.C.H. King (ed.), Human image (London, The British Museum Press, 2000)
J. Robinson, Masterpieces: Medieval Art (London, British Museum Press, 2008)
T. Richard Blurton (ed.), The enduring image: treasures, exh. cat (British Council, 1997)

Medieval European objects in the British Museum
Silver objects
Christian reliquaries